is a former Japanese football player.

Playing career
Meta was born in Kirishima on July 2, 1982. After graduating from high school, he joined J1 League club Avispa Fukuoka in 2001. However he could not play at all in the match and Avispa was relegated to J2 League end of 2001 season. He debuted in 2002 and became a regular player as defensive midfielder from 2003. In 2005, he moved to Kyoto Purple Sanga (later Kyoto Sanga FC). Sanga won the champions in 2005 season and was promoted to J1. Although he played as regular player, he lost his position in August and Sanga finished at bottom place in2006 season. In 2007 J2 League, he could not play at all in the match. In July 2007, he moved to Japan Football League (JFL) club Tochigi SC and played many matches. In 2008, he moved to J2 club Tokushima Vortis. He played as regular player until 2009. However he could not play at all in the match in 2010. In 2011, he moved to Sagan Tosu. Although Sagan won the 2nd place in 2011 season and was promoted to J1, he could not play many matches and left the club end of 2011 season. In 2012, he moved to Regional Leagues club FC Kagoshima based in his local. Although he played many matches in 2012, he could not play many matches in 2013 and left the club in May 2013. After 3 years blank, he joined Regional Leagues club Tegevajaro Miyazaki in 2016. Tegevajaro was promoted to JFL from 2018 season. He retired end of 2018 season.

Club statistics

References

External links

1982 births
Living people
Association football people from Kagoshima Prefecture
Japanese footballers
J1 League players
J2 League players
Japan Football League players
Avispa Fukuoka players
Kyoto Sanga FC players
Tochigi SC players
Tokushima Vortis players
Sagan Tosu players
Tegevajaro Miyazaki players
Association football midfielders